is a Japanese manga series by Tanishi Kawano. An anime adaptation by ComicFesta was aired from July to September 2019 under the title  in two versions. A second season aired from July to August 2021.

Plot

Ryo Fujihashi, a 24-year-old office worker, is childhood friends with Souma Mizuno, a firefighter. She plans on setting him up with a co-worker from her office, but she assumes the reason why their dates fail is because of his womanizing ways. When Souma saves her when her apartment catches on fire, he offers her a place to stay. Ryo later learns that he has been in love with her for a long time.

Characters

Media

Manga

Fire in His Fingertips: A Flirty Fireman Ravishes Me with His Smoldering Gaze is written and illustrated by Tanishi Kawano. It is serialized digitally on Screamo under their Zettai Ryōiki R! label beginning in September 2018. The chapters have been released in 7 bound volumes by Suiseisha under the Clair TL Comics imprint.

In September 2019, Seven Seas Entertainment licensed the series in English for North American release under their adult imprint, Ghost Ship.

Anime

In May 2019, ComicFesta announced that they were creating an anime adaptation, with the title , and aired from July 8 to September 1, 2019 on Tokyo MX. The anime is produced by Studio Hōkiboshi, with Toshihiro Watase as director, Tombo as scriptwriter, and Katsuyuki Sato as the animation director. Like ComicFesta's other series, two versions of the anime were produced with different cast members: a standard version for television broadcast, and a complete version including sexual content for streaming on ComicFesta Anime's website. The theme song is "Blazing Luv!!" by Sakuragaoka Fire Brigade, which is composed of the voice actors for Souma, Yuki, and Jun. The same song is performed in the complete version by Tri Fighter, consisting of the complete version's voice cast.

A second season has been announced and aired from July 5 to August 23, 2021. The cast and staff will return to reprise their roles.

On December 1, 2021, it was announced that both seasons of the anime will receive an English dub produced by Ascendent Animation.

My Childhood Friend is a Firefighter

My Boyfriend is a Firefighter

Reception

Rebecca Silverman from Anime News Network felt that the first volume was a "fun contemporary romance" for adult women aside from yaoi manga and claimed Ryo was a strong female lead; however, she also warned that there were some non-consensual scenes.

Notes

References

External links
  
 

2018 manga
2019 anime television series debuts
2021 anime television series debuts
Firefighting in fiction
Josei manga
Romance anime and manga
Seven Seas Entertainment titles